Alcatel may refer to:

 Alcatel, a former French telecommunications equipment company, which became Alcatel-Lucent and is now part of Nokia
 Alcatel Mobile, a brand of mobile phones, tablets and wearables, formerly a joint venture between Alcatel-Lucent and TCL, now owned by Nokia and licensed to TCL
 Alcatel Vacuum Technology, a former manufacturer of vacuum pumps